BRF S.A. is a Brazilian food processing company with over 30 brands in its portfolio. They include Sadia, Perdigão, Qualy, Paty, Dánica and Bocatti. Its products are sold in over 150 countries and on five continents. More than 100 thousand employees work at the company, which owns more than 50 factories in eight countries: Argentina, Brazil, United Arab Emirates, Netherlands, Malaysia, United Kingdom, Thailand, and Turkey.

In 2016, the company sold over four million tons of food and made more than 600 thousand monthly deliveries. Over thirteen thousand integrated producers work daily in the field to supply fundamental ingredients of the food produced by the company: poultry and pork.

BRF is the result of the merger between Sadia and Perdigão, two major food companies in Brazil. The operation was announced in 2009, and concluded on July 13, 2013, after being approved by the Administrative Council for Economic Defense – Conselho Administrativo de Defesa Econômica (CADE). As the process was concluded, both Sadia and Perdigão stopped functioning as independent companies and became subsumed as brands under BRF's portfolio.

History 

The negotiation for the acquisition of Sadia by Perdigão started in 2008, with then-president José Antonio do Prado Fay. The successful merger, officially announced in May 2009, created BRF, which continued under Fay's lead.

In October 2011, BRF made two acquisitions in Argentina, acquiring the companies Avex (a poultry company) and Dánica (a leading company in the production of margarine) for 150 million dollars.

One year later, in Abu Dhabi, BRF acquired 49% of the food distribution company Federal Foods, for 36 million dollars.

In 2012, once the merger process between Perdigão and Sadia was concluded, the company (which was then called BRF Brasil Foods) became one of the biggest food companies in the world.

In the following year, to consolidate as a global brand, the company changed its name to BRF S.A. Since then, the company has presented itself to the market as BRF. While keeping up with the changes within the company, The company's logo was redesigned after two years of research among strategic audiences, accomplished with the help of consulting agencies Interbrand and A10.

In April 2013, entrepreneur Abilio Diniz was elected as the new president of BRF's Administrative Council. He boosts the plan for internal changes. After four months, Claudio Galeazzi occupies José Antonio do Prado Fay's position, becoming the company's CEO. Galeazzi repeats with Abilio Diniz a partnership that lasted years, similar to other companies where Diniz was in charge (like Grupo Pão de Açúcar, for instance).

In May 2013, Sadia officially announces its support of the Olympic Games and Paralympic Rio 2016 Games. From June 2013 to January 2016, the brand was also a sponsor for Brazil's National Soccer Team. The contract included the main team and all other categories. The numbers of the deal were not published.

In April 2014, another slice of Federal Foods is acquired by close to US$27.8 million; in August of that same year, BRF incorporates Alyasra Food Company, a frozen food distributor from Kuwait, for 160 million dollars. With those acquisitions, the company expands its operations in the Middle East and follows through with its plan to become more international.

In September 2014, BRF sold its dairy assets to the French group Lactalis for R$1.8 billion. Among the sold assets are brands such as Batavo, Cotochés, and Elegê. According to BRF, the decision of selling the dairy division was a consequence of the low return the company was getting from it. In that same month, Claudio Galeazzi announced he is leaving the group's presidency and the executive Pedro Faria takes his place, effective January 2015.

In 2015, BRF became the first Brazilian company to invest in offering Green Bonds, which are debt securities that come with a guarantee that all resources collected will be invested in environmentally responsible projects. In that year, 50.2% of BRF's income came from the international market (export).

Following through with the strategic plan of turning the company global, during that same year, in Asia, SATS BRF was created in Singapore; in China, BRF launched a line of snacks with the Sadia brand; in the Middle East, Qatar National Import and Export (QNIE) was partially acquired; in Argentina, they acquired iconic brands such as Vieníssima (sausages), Goodmark (hamburgers) and Manty and Delícia (margarine) through the Avex and QuickFood subsidiaries.

Back in Brazil, still in 2015, Perdigão went back to acting in strategic categories (ham and smoked sausage amongst others) after being away from the market for three years, as agreed with the CADE during the Sadia and Perdigão merger.

In 2016, the Sadia Halal subsidiary was created, which manages the assets related to producing, distributing, and selling food to Muslim markets. A deal was made with FFM Berhad as well, ensuring the cooperation between the two companies with FFM Further Processing SDN BHD ("FFP"), a food processing company based out of Malaysia. Also in 2016, BRF sealed an investing deal with COFCO Meat, a Chinese food producer focused on swine, with vertically integrated operations in all chains of that industry segment.

At the beginning of 2017, BRF began the operations of its subsidiary OneFoods, focused on the halal market. Headquartered in Dubai, in the United Arab Emirates, the company came into the market already as the biggest halal animal protein company in the world. It arrives in Turkey, the largest consumer of halal chicken on the planet, to take over the operations of Banvit, the biggest poultry producer and market leader in the country.

In 2021, BRF started to invest in cultured meat research through Aleph Farms, expecting to bring it to market by 2024.

Investors 
In 2015, it was one of the ten companies from Brazil that were chosen to be a part of the Euronext-Vigeo EM 70, a European stock exchange index that includes companies from developing countries that have high performance in corporate governance.

References

External links
 

Companies based in Santa Catarina (state)
Meat companies of Brazil
Companies listed on B3 (stock exchange)
Food and drink companies established in 1934
1934 establishments in Brazil
Food and drink companies of Brazil